The play-offs of the UEFA Women's Euro 2017 qualifying competition involved the two runners-up with the worst records among all eight groups in the qualifying group stage: Portugal and Romania. The draw for the play-offs (to decide the order of legs) was held on 23 September 2016.

The play-offs were played in home-and-away two-legged format. The play-off winner qualified for the final tournament.

Ranking of second-placed teams

Despite the fact that every groups had 5 teams, in order to determine the six best second-placed teams from the qualifying group stage which qualified directly for the final tournament and the two remaining second-placed teams which advanced to the play-offs, the results against the fifth-placed team were not included. As a result, six matches played by each second-placed team were counted for the purposes of determining the ranking.

Overview
All times are CEST (UTC+2).

|}

Portugal qualified for the final tournament.

First leg

Second leg

References

External links
Fixtures, UEFA.com

Play-offs
October 2016 sports events in Europe